Storm at Sunup is the third album and opening track of Italian-Canadian jazz-pop singer-songwriter, Gino Vannelli, and was produced by Vannelli and his brother Joe. Unlike his other albums, Storm at Sunup is a jazz fusion album with much less pop influence. The album features contributions by Graham Lear, who would go on to be Santana's drummer in the 1980s.

The title track was chosen by famed choreographer Lionel Blair for use in a dance sequence that was part of a 1976 episode of the television series Space: 1999 titled "One Moment of Humanity". A pared-down, instrumental version of the song was specially recorded for the episode by series composer Derek Wadsworth.

Track listing

Personnel

Production 
 Produced and Arranged by Gino Vannelli and Joe Vannelli.
 Synthesizer, horn and string arrangements by Gino Vannelli and Richard Baker.
 Engineer – Tommy Vicari
 Assistant Engineer – Ed Thacker
 Mastered by Bernie Grundman at A&M Studios (Hollywood, CA).
 Art Direction – Roland Young
 Design and Photography – Bob Seidemann 
 Record label – Ariola Benelux B.V. 
 Manufactured by Ariola Eurodisc Benelux B.V. 
 Distributed by Ariola Eurodisc Benelux B.V. 
 Phonographic Copyright (p) – A&M Records, Inc.

Musicians 
 Gino Vannelli – lead and backing vocals
 Joe Vannelli – acoustic piano, electric piano, synthesizers
 Richard Baker – organ, synthesizers, synth bass
 Jay Graydon – electric guitars
Graham Lear – drums
 John J. Mandel – percussion 
 Sergio Pastora – congas, talking drum
 Don Bailey – harmonica
 Jerome Richardson – tenor saxophone, soprano saxophone
 Ross Vannelli – backing vocals
 Sally Stevens – backing vocals

Charts

Singles

References

External links
 

1975 albums
Gino Vannelli albums
A&M Records albums
Albums recorded at A&M Studios